Joshua J. Johnson (born May 10, 1976) is an American sprinter who specialized in the 200 metres. Johnson is a world champion in the  relay.

Achievements

Personal bests
100 metres - 9.95 s (2002)
200 metres - 19.88 s (2001)

References

External links
USA Track & Field Bio

American male sprinters
1976 births
Living people
World Athletics Championships medalists
Goodwill Games medalists in athletics
Oklahoma Panhandle State Aggies men's track and field athletes
World Athletics Championships winners
Competitors at the 2001 Goodwill Games